Paolo Monaldi (1710 – after 1779) was an Italian painter of the late-Baroque or Rococo style, known for painting Bambocciata, or genre scenes of public activities.

He was born and died in Rome, and initially trained in the studio of Paolo Anesi. Monaldi worked under Anesi in the fresco decoration of the Villa Chigi, presumably of Cardinal Flavio Chigi, painted between 1765 and 1767. In particular, he contributed to the paintings depicting the myth of Diana and Endymion, and with Angelica and Medoro over a series of eight landscapes with bambocciate. Monaldi's rural scenes recall the work of the Anesi colleague, Andrea Locatelli, also active in Rome. He was also a painter for Palazzo Rospigliosi. Palazzo Braschi and the Accademia di San Luca.

On the basis of the Lanzi, Stefano Ticozzi in his Dictionary of Painters by the renewing of Fine Arts until 1800, (1818) cites him as "not ignoble painter bambocciate"

References
 Translated from Italian Wikipedia

1710 births
1779 deaths
Painters from Rome
18th-century Italian painters
Italian male painters
Italian Baroque painters
Italian genre painters
Fresco painters
18th-century Italian male artists